Init or INIT may refer to:
 init, the first process started during boot of a Unix system
 INIT (Mac OS), a system-extension mechanism in Apple Macintosh operating system prior to OS X 
 INIT II, an intranasal insulin clinical trial
 Init Records, an American record label
 International IT College of Sweden
 INIT, a German-headquartered IT company working in public transport

See also 
 Initialization (disambiguation)